Hari Rajguru (born 24 December 1939) is an Indian former cricketer. He played two first-class matches for Bengal in 1960/61.

See also
 List of Bengal cricketers

References

External links
 

1939 births
Living people
Indian cricketers
Bengal cricketers
People from Asansol